Barry Martin Bennett (December 10, 1955 – August 19, 2019) was a professional American football defensive tackle who played eleven seasons in the National Football League (NFL) for the New Orleans Saints, New York Jets and the Minnesota Vikings. He attended and played football at Concordia College (Moorhead, Minnesota), where he was coached by Jim Christopherson.

Death
Bennett and his wife Carol were found shot to death at their Long Prairie, Minnesota, home on August 21, 2019. A friend went to check on them after phone calls and texts had gone unanswered since the day prior. Investigators determined that the couple was killed on August 19; Carol was shot multiple times in the back and torso, while Barry was shot multiple times in the head and torso.

On August 23, the couple's son, 22-year-old Dylan Bennett, was charged with two counts of second-degree murder, without premeditation, in connection with the killings. He is believed to have taken his mother's car and traveled to Columbus, Ohio, from where he boarded a flight to Cancun, Mexico. Barry had told the Todd County Sheriff's Office in December 2018 that Dylan had expressed thoughts about killing his parents while being treated at a mental health facility. Dylan was arrested in Cancun on August 24. Dylan Bennett pled guilty on August 24, 2020 and was sentenced to two concurrent prison terms of 'life without parole'.

References

1955 births
2019 deaths
American football defensive linemen
Concordia Cobbers football players
New Orleans Saints players
New York Jets players
Minnesota Vikings players
People from Long Prairie, Minnesota
Players of American football from Saint Paul, Minnesota
Deaths by firearm in Minnesota
People murdered in Minnesota
Patricides